Lagong or Bukit Lagong is a small town and a forest reserve area in Selayang, Selangor, Malaysia, located between Kuang and Batu Caves.

Gombak District
Towns in Selangor